Benjamin Arthur Flemyng  (3 January 1912 – 22 May 1995), known professionally as Robert Flemyng, was a British actor. The son of a doctor, and originally intended for a medical career, Flemyng learned his stagecraft in provincial repertory theatre. In 1935 he appeared in a leading role in the West End, and the following year had his first major success, in Terence Rattigan's comedy French Without Tears. Between then and the Second World War he appeared in London and New York in a succession of comedies.

On the outbreak of war in 1939 Flemyng volunteered for the Royal Army Service Corps, and served with distinction, winning the Military Cross. After the war he continued to appear in light comedies, but also took on more serious roles in plays by T. S. Eliot, Graham Greene, John Whiting and others. He toured Australia, Britain, Canada, India, South Africa and the US in a wide range of parts, from comedy to classic drama.

Flemyng's broadcasting was principally in two television series in the 1960s, in the second of which, Compact, he appeared in more than 100 episodes. He made more than 30 cinema films, including The Guinea Pig (1948), The Blue Lamp (1950), The Man Who Never Was (1956), Blind Date (1959) and The Quiller Memorandum (1966).

Life and career

Early years

Flemyng was born in Liverpool, the son of George Gilbert Flemyng, a physician, and his second wife Rowena Eleanor, née Jacques. He was educated at Haileybury, and was then a medical student before abandoning medicine in favour of the theatre.

In June 1931, at the age of 19, Flemyng made his stage debut, playing Kenneth Raglan in Patrick Hamilton's thriller Rope at the County Theatre, Truro. He made his first appearance in London at the Westminster Theatre in October 1931, walking on in The Anatomist, and during 1932 he toured with Violet Vanbrugh's company, playing Cyril Greenwood in After All. In 1932 he joined the Liverpool Repertory Company at the Liverpool Playhouse. The company was directed by William Armstrong, who became known for training future stars including Robert Donat, Rex Harrison, Michael Redgrave and Diana Wynyard. Flemyng stayed at the Playhouse for three seasons, playing a wide range of roles. While there, he met his future wife, the actress Carmen Sugars.

Flemyng was still under contract to the Liverpool company when Raymond Massey and Gladys Cooper offered him a major West End role in the comedy Worse Things Happen at Sea. Armstrong, always willing to help his protégés, arranged for Flemyng's immediate release from the rest of his contract. The new play opened at the St James's Theatre; reviews for the piece were lukewarm but the cast, including Flemyng, were praised by the press. He played in four more light comedy roles between September 1935 and March 1936, before his first big success, of which the director Derek Granger wrote:

The play ran for 1,025 performances. Fleming played the role for 18 months, before handing over to Hubert Gregg for the rest of the run.

In April 1938 Flemyng appeared as the juvenile lead in a new Ben Travers farce, Banana Ridge. Later that year he made his North American debut, playing Tony Fox-Collier in the comedy Spring Meeting, which opened at His Majesty's Theatre, Montreal in November and at the Morosco Theatre, New York the following month, running there until March 1939. He remained on Broadway to play Makepiece Lovell in No Time for Comedy; his notices were good: the stars of the production were Laurence Olivier and Katherine Cornell but the reviewer in The Stage said that Flemyng "comes close to walking away with the show". In September 1939, on the outbreak of the Second World War, Flemying left the cast and returned to England to join the armed forces. He was an avid Everton FC supporter.

Second World War and post-war

Flemyng volunteered for the Royal Army Service Corps. He was commissioned and rose to become a full colonel at 33, one of the youngest in the British army. The Independent reports that "he served with great gallantry in Eritrea and Italy, in both of which campaigns he saw action". He was awarded the Military Cross (MC) in 1941, was mentioned in despatches, and was appointed OBE (military) in 1945.

At the end of the war Flemyng's first appearance was as Lord Harpenden in Rattigan's While the Sun Shines in an ENSA tour that finished at the Théâtre Marigny, Paris. In Britain he played a more serious role than usual in The Guinea Pig, a long-running play about a social experiment in which a working-class boy is sent to an exclusive private school. He reprised the role in a film version of the play, released in 1948. In 1947 he again played on Broadway, in a company led by John Gielgud; Flemyng played Algernon Moncrieff to Gielgud's John Worthing in The Importance of Being Earnest and Ben to his Valentine in Love for Love.

After returning to England, Flemyng appeared as Rowlie Bateson in Frank Vosper's People Like Us (July 1948), and Philotas in Rattigan's Adventure Story (June 1949). In a revival of French Without Tears he switched roles, playing the Hon Alan Howard, the part played by Rex Harrison in the first production. According to Granger, Flemyng "revealed a new, unsuspected, strength" when he appeared with Alec Guinness in T. S. Eliot's blank verse play The Cocktail Party at the  Edinburgh Festival and then London and New York, in 1949–50. As Edward Chamberlayne, the distraught husband, Flemyng:

1950s and 1960s

In the 1950s, Flemyng moved between light comedy – new and classic –  and more serious roles. He toured southern Africa in Nancy Mitford's The Little Hut  and Roger MacDougall's To Dorothy, A Son, and in London took over in the former from Robert Morley in the West End run. The piece ran for 1,261 performances; Flemyng was succeeded by Hugh Sinclair. In 1952–53 Flemyng toured the US, co-starring with Cornell, in Somerset Maugham's The Constant Wife. In 1954 he played a serious role, General Rupert Forster, a war criminal, in John Whiting's Marching Song.

Later in 1954 Flemyng  appeared at the ANTA Playhouse, Broadway in a short-lived adaptation of Henry James's Portrait of a Lady. After a British tour in John Van Druten's comedy Bell, Book and Candle, Flemyng returned to Broadway in January 1957 to create the role of James Callifer in Graham Greene's The Potting Shed. In the same year he made his first Hollywood film, accepting Stanley Donen's invitation to appear in Funny Face.

In the 1960s Flemyng played a wide range of roles from old classics to heavyweight modern works and light comedy. He played Dr Sloper in The Heiress (1964), toured Australia as Anthony Wilcox in the boardroom melodrama Difference of Opinion (1965), returned to the US in The Cocktail Party, this time in the central role of Harcourt-Reilly (1965), and toured Britain as Garry Essendine in Present Laughter (1966).

Back in London, Flemyng played Richard Halton in On Approval (1966), Gregory Butler in Giles Cooper's Happy Family (1957), and Colonel Melkett in Black Comedy (1968). His final stage roles of the decade were in plays by Shakespeare and Shaw: Shylock in The Merchant of Venice at the Playhouse, Newcastle, in March 1969. Sir Colenso Ridgeon in The Doctor's Dilemma at the Shaw Festival, Niagara-on-the-Lake in June 1969, and Sir Broadfoot Basham in On the Rocks on a British tour later in the year.

Later years: 1970–1995

At the beginning of the 1970s Flemyng again appeared in Shaw plays, as Mr Bompas in How He Lied to Her Husband and General Michelin in Press Cuttings (1970). Later in the year he played Maitland in The Chalk Garden, and returned to Shaw in 1971 as the Rev James Morrell in Candida. In 1973 he toured as Andrew Wyke in Sleuth, and the following year he toured South Africa as Sebastian Crutwell in Rattigan's In Praise of Love, subsequently repeating the part at the Theatre Royal, Windsor in 1975. Later in the year he toured in England and Canada as Philip in Alan Ayckbourn's Relatively Speaking.

In 1980 Flemyng played Sorin in The Seagull with Barbara Jefford as Arkadina, and the following year he co-starred in William Douglas-Home's The Kingfisher with Michael Denison and Dulcie Gray. He appeared for two years at the Savoy Theatre in Michael Frayn's Noises Off, taking over the role of Selsdon Mowbray from Michael Aldridge in early 1983 and handing it over to Hugh Paddick at the end of 1984. In 1988 he played Colonel Pickering in My Fair Lady to the Higgins of Denis Quilley and the Eliza of Liz Robertson. The following year he appeared with Michael Gambon and Jack Lemmon at the Haymarket in Veterans' Day in which they played veterans of, respectively, the First and Second World Wars and the Vietnam War.

In his late seventies Flemyng went on an arduous tour of India with John Dexter's Haymarket company, playing the title role in Julius Caesar, and Oedipus in Creon, Stephen Spender's version of Sophocles'  Oedipus Rex.  Among his last stage performances was a return to The Chalk Garden in 1992, this time playing the Judge, to the Mrs St Maugham of Constance Cummings and the Miss Marigold of Jean Marsh.

Broadcasting and cinema
Television

Flemyng's first television appearance was in 1949, playing Alan Howard in an adaptation of French Without Tears. In 1961 he co-starred with A. J. Brown in the ITV Granada series Family Solicitor. In 1962 and 1963 he played Edmund Bruce in more than 100 episodes of the BBC soap opera Compact. In 1964 he took the role of Julian in a TV version of A Day by the Sea, and the following year appeared as Michael in Graham Greene's The Living Room. In a dramatisation of Vanity Fair in 1970 he played Lord Steyne, and in 1979 he played Colonel Julyan in Daphne du Maurier's Rebecca.  In 1982, in an eight-part adaptation of Howard Spring's Fame Is the Spur he played Lord Lostwithiel. In one-off television dramas he appeared in works by Agatha Christie (Spider's Web, 1985) and Muriel Spark (Memento Mori, 1992) and in 1995 he made his last television appearances, as John Godwin in a five-part adaptation of Joanna Trollope's The Choir.

Radio
Flemyng was only an occasional broadcaster on radio. The BBC relayed excerpts from the stage productions of The Guinea Pig in 1946 and Adventure Story in 1949, and he appeared with Gielgud in scenes from The Importance of Being Earnest in 1947. He played Edward Voysey in a radio version of The Voysey Inheritance in 1951 and was in an adaptation of Happy Family broadcast by the West End cast in 1967.

Cinema

In his Who's Who entry Flemyng mentioned four of his films: Head Over Heels – his first – and The Guinea Pig (1948), The Blue Lamp (1950) and The Man Who Never Was (1956). His other film roles included a senior policeman in the 1959 Joseph Losey drama Blind Date opposite Stanley Baker, and the sardonic British Secret Intelligence Service chief in the 1966 thriller The Quiller Memorandum opposite George Sanders. His later films include Kafka (1991) and Shadowlands (1993).

 Head Over Heels (1937) as Pierre
 Bond Street (1948) as Frank Moody
 The Guinea Pig (1948) as Nigel Lorraine
 Conspirator (1949) as Captain Hugh Ladholme
 The Blue Lamp (1950) as Det. Sgt. Roberts
 Blackmailed (1951) as Dr. Giles Freeman
 The Magic Box (1951) as Doctor in Surgery
 The Holly and the Ivy (1952) as Major
 Cast a Dark Shadow (1955) as Philip Mortimer
 The Man Who Never Was (1956) as Lt. George Acres
 Funny Face (1957) as Paul Duval
 Let's Be Happy (1957) as Lord James MacNairn
 Windom's Way (1957) as Col. George Hasbrook
 Blind Date (1959) as Sir Brian Lewis
 A Touch of Larceny (1959) as Cmdr. John Larkin
 The Horrible Dr. Hichcock (1962) as Prof. Bernard Hichcock
 The King's Breakfast (1963) as Chamberlain
 Mystery Submarine (1963) as Vice-Adm. Sir James Carver

 The Quiller Memorandum (1966) as Rushington
 The Spy with a Cold Nose (1966) as Chief MI5
 The Deadly Affair (1967) as Samuel Fennan
 The Blood Beast Terror (1968) as Dr. Carl Mallinger
 The Body Stealers (1969) as Wing Cmdr. Baldwin
 Oh! What a Lovely War (1969) as Major Mallory as Staff Officer in Gassed Trench
 Battle of Britain (1969) as Wing Cmdr. Willoughby
 The Firechasers (1971) as Carlton
 Young Winston (1972) as Dr. Buzzard
 The Darwin Adventure (1972) as Prof. Henslow
 Travels with My Aunt (1972) as Crowder
 Golden Rendezvous (1977) as Capt. Bullen
 The Four Feathers (1978) as Old Colonel
 The Medusa Touch (1978) as Judge McKinley
 The Thirty Nine Steps (1978) as Magistrate
 Paris by Night (1988) as Jack Sidmouth
 Kafka (1991) as The Keeper of the Files
 Shadowlands (1993) as Claude Bird

Personal life

Flemyng married Carmen Martha Sugars in November 1939; by this time, she had switched from acting into theatrical décor, joining the design team Motley. The couple had one daughter. According to a 2003 biography of Alec Guinness, Flemyng, though a devoted family man, was essentially gay, and fell in love in middle age with a younger man, suffering emotional distress that affected his health. The marriage survived, lasting until Carmen Flemyng's death in 1994. Flemyng suffered a stroke in April 1995, and died on 22 May, aged 83. In its obituary, The Stage'' called him "one of this country's most distinguished and respected performers, the last of the great matinee idols".

References and sources

References

Sources

 

 

1912 births
1995 deaths
English male film actors
English male stage actors
British Army personnel of World War II
Royal Army Service Corps officers
Recipients of the Military Cross
Officers of the Order of the British Empire
People educated at Haileybury and Imperial Service College
Male actors from Liverpool
20th-century English male actors
Royal Army Service Corps soldiers